STRL may refer to:

NHK Science & Technology Research Laboratories
Statesboro Regional Public Libraries